Walid Mattar (born June 7, 1980) is a Tunisian film director. He grew up in Tunis and moved to France at the age of 23. Interested in film from an early age, he joined the Tunisian Faculty of Amateur Cinematographers when he was just 13. He made a number of short films before directing his first feature-length movie in 2017, titled Vent du Nord (North Wind).

References

Tunisian film directors
People from Tunis
1980 births
Living people